Alison Dias Heck or simply Alisson (born May 31, 1984), is a Brazilian central defender. He currently plays for Paraná.

Contract
1 September 2002 to 1 September 2008

External links
CBF

1984 births
Living people
Brazilian footballers
Paraná Clube players
Brazilian people of German descent
Association football defenders